The Dream of the Shepherd is a late 19th century painting by Swiss artist Ferdinand Hodler. Done in oil on canvas, the painting depicts a Shepard kneeling in a field while dreaming of nude women.

Description 
Ferdinand Hodler painted Dream in 1896. Unlike his previous, more realist works, Dream shows Hodler's interest in Symbolist paintings. 

Dream was first shown during the Swiss national exhibition in Geneva. Sources have commented that Hodler's submittance of Dream to the 1896 exebition was possibly done to provoke the Swiss art community, noting that Hodler's rendering of copious nude figures in the painting may have been influenced by rejections of his earlier works as being too sexual. In addition, Hodler debuted the painting at the Théâtre du Sapajou in Geneva, possibly an intentional choice given the theater was associated with satire. According to the Met's description of Dream, the painting and situation surrounding its debut earned Hodler "considerable" notoriety. 

The painting was originally owned by the Kunsthandlung Rath in Basel before being sold to a private collector in the 1920s. Dream was acquired by the Metropolitan Museum of Art in 2013 and remains in the Met's collection.

References 

1896 paintings
Paintings in the collection of the Metropolitan Museum of Art
Swiss paintings